West Palm Beach station is a train station in West Palm Beach, Florida. It is served by Amtrak passenger rail and Tri-Rail commuter rail service. It is located at 203–209 South Tamarind Avenue, south of First Street/Banyan Boulevard.

History

The station officially opened to passengers in January 1925 as a Seaboard Air Line Railway depot. The building was designed by the Palm Beach architectural firm of Harvey & Clarke. Among other Seaboard trains, the station was served by the Orange Blossom Special until 1953, and the Silver Meteor beginning in 1939. Amtrak maintained Silver Meteor service to the station when it took over intercity passenger train service in 1971. Both the Silver Meteor and Amtrak's Silver Star continue to use the station. The station was placed on the National Register of Historic Places on June 19, 1973. Tri-Rail service to the station began in 1989.The City of West Palm Beach, following a purchase of the building in 1988, tapped local architecture firm Oliver Glidden & Partners to head a $4.3 million restoration of the structure. The project was completed and the station rededicated in a ceremony attended by the Florida Governor in April 1991. Architect Robert D. Brown directed the restoration of ornamental cast stone elements, exterior masonry, doors, windows, and iron and tile work. The red clay tile roof was replaced, as were the electrical, lighting, plumbing and heating, ventilation and air conditioning systems. Abatement of lead and asbestos was further required to bring the historic structure up to modern building code standards. The restoration effort earned the Florida Trust Award for Historic Preservation in 1994.

In summer 2012, the city finished an improvement project that included the installation of new sidewalks and more than five dozen trees around the building. The improvements were funded with a $750,000 Transportation Enhancement grant from the Federal Highway Administration, to which the city provided a $150,000 local match.

Since the 1997 closure of the Palm Beach Airport station closer to Palm Beach International Airport, Tri-Rail passengers access the airport via taxi and PalmTran's fixed bus route 44.

Station layout
The station has two side platforms, with access to the station on both sides. West of the southbound platform is a long loop of bus bays serving Palm Tran routes. East of the northbound platform is the station house, a small parking lot, and bus stops for Greyhound Lines buses and Tri-Rail shuttles.

Notes

External links

West Palm Beach Station – South Florida Regional Transportation Authority
West Palm Beach Amtrak/Tri-Rail Station – USA Rail Guide (TrainWeb)
Station from Google Maps Street View

Railway stations on the National Register of Historic Places in Florida
Amtrak stations in Florida
Railway stations in the United States opened in 1925
National Register of Historic Places in Palm Beach County, Florida
Seaboard Air Line Railroad stations
Tri-Rail stations in Palm Beach County, Florida
Buildings and structures in West Palm Beach, Florida
1925 establishments in Florida